Botswana competed in the 2008 Summer Olympics which were held in Beijing, People's Republic of China from August 8 to August 24, 2008.

Athletics

Men
Track & road events

Field events

Women
Track & road events

Key
Note–Ranks given for track events are within the athlete's heat only
Q = Qualified for the next round
q = Qualified for the next round as a fastest loser or, in field events, by position without achieving the qualifying target
NR = National record
N/A = Round not applicable for the event
Bye = Athlete not required to compete in round

Boxing

Botswana qualified two boxers for the Olympic boxing tournament. Ikgopoleng qualified in the bantamweight at the first African qualifying event.  Batshegi qualified in the featherweight at the second African event.

Swimming

Qualifiers for the latter rounds of all events were decided on a time only basis, therefore positions shown are overall results versus competitors in all heats.

Men

Women

See also
 Botswana at the 2006 Commonwealth Games
 Botswana at the 2008 Summer Paralympics
 Botswana at the 2010 Commonwealth Games

References
sports-reference

2008
Nations at the 2008 Summer Olympics
Olympics